Johari may refer to:
Johari (film), a 2006 Tanzanian film
Johari dialect, a dialect of the Kumaoni language of India
Johari window, in interpersonal communication and relationships

People with the name 
Azizi Johari (born 1948), American model and actress
Ismail Johari, Malaysian writer
Johari Johnson, American actress and comedian
Johari Abdul, Malaysian politician
Johari Abdul Ghani, Malaysian politician
Johari Abdul-Malik, American imam
Johari Amini, American editor
Johari Ramli (born 1949), Malaysian cyclist
Khairul Helmi Johari (born 1988), Malaysian footballer
Khir Johari (1923–2006), Malaysian politician
Nurfais Johari (born 1999), Malaysian footballer
Nurul Farhanah Johari, Malaysian weightlifter
Tarmizi Johari, Bruneian footballer
Zairil Khir Johari (born 1982), Malaysian politician
Mohammed Ali bin Johari (1976–2008), Singaporean convicted murderer who raped and killed his stepdaughter.

See also 
 Johari-Goldstein relaxation, in physics
 Maulana Muhammad Ali Johar, Indian jurist and central figure of the Khilafat Movement
 Allama Talib Jauhri, Pakistani Islamic scholar and religious leader